Sikanni Old Growth Provincial Park is a provincial park in British Columbia, Canada.

External links

Northern Rockies Regional Municipality
Provincial parks of British Columbia
Protected areas established in 1999
1999 establishments in British Columbia